Eduardo Arbide Allende (4 December 1900 - 13 November 1987) known in Spain as "Arbide", was a Spanish footballer of Basque origin who played for Real Sociedad and the Spain national side.

Early years
Arbide was born in Rosario, Argentina to Basque immigrant parents, he moved back to Spain with his parents at a young age. He began playing football for the Real Sociedad youth team in his teenage years.

He was also a talented athlete who achieved a gold medal in the 4 × 250 metres event as a member of the Gipuzkoa team at the 1920 edition of the Spanish Athletics Championships (alongside Olympic sprinters Félix Mendizábal and Juan Muguerza).

Career

Club
Arbide, who spent his entire sporting career in Spain, played for Real Sociedad between 1919 and 1925, winning three regional championships with the club.

International
Arbide played one game for the Spain national team on 18 December 1921 in a 3-1 win against Portugal in Madrid.

Titles
Campeonato Guipuzcoano (3): 1919, 1923, 1925

See also
List of Spain international footballers born outside Spain

References

External links
  Profile at Fútbol en La Red

Footballers from Rosario, Santa Fe
Argentine footballers
Spanish footballers
Spain international footballers
Association football forwards
Footballers from the Basque Country (autonomous community)
Real Sociedad footballers
1900 births
1987 deaths
Argentine people of Basque descent
Argentine emigrants to Spain
Basque Country international footballers